George Tedman (1885 – 15 July 1976) was a member of the Queensland Legislative Assembly.

Biography
Tedman was born in London, England, the son of James John Dodd Tedman and his wife Ellen Mary (née Sales). He came to Australia as a child and was educated at Ipswich State School. He was a grocer at South Brisbane and produce merchant at Woolloongabba.

He married Margaret Annie Elizabeth Dougherty in 1914 (died 1974) and together had one son and one daughter. Tedman died in July 1976 and was cremated at Mt Thompson Crematorium.

Public career
Tedman, representing the Country and Progressive National Party was the member for Maree in the Queensland Legislative Assembly from 1929 until his retirement three years later in 1932.

He was a member of the Pineapple Rovers Football Club and the Kangaroo Point Cricket Club.

References

Members of the Queensland Legislative Assembly
1885 births
1976 deaths
20th-century Australian politicians